Kevin James Dobson (born 1952) is an Australian director who worked extensively in film and television. His full name is used in order to avoid confusion with the actor Kevin Dobson.

Personal life
Dobson was born in Manchester. He emigrated to Australia with his parents in 1968. He was formerly married to Australian actress Noni Hazlehurst.

Select Credits
The Mango Tree (1977) (film)
Gone to Ground (1977) (TV movie)
Image of Death (1978) (TV movie)
Demolition (1978) (TV movie)
The Last Outlaw (1980) (mini series)
I Can Jump Puddles (1981)
Squizzy Taylor (1982) (film)
Five Mile Creek (1984-85) (TV series)
Miracle in the Wilderness (1991) (TV Movie) 
What She Doesn't Know (1992) (TV movie)
Acapulco H.E.A.T. (1992–93) (TV series)
Gold Diggers: The Secret of Bear Mountain (1995) (film)
Babylon 5 (1996–97) (TV series)
The Virgin of Juarez (2006)
Savages Crossing (2011)

References

External links
Kevin James Dobson at IMDb
Kevin James Dobson
Kevin James Dobson at AustLit (subscription required)

Living people
Australian film directors
1952 births
Australian television directors